General Juan José Torres had taken the Presidency 7 October 1970, and formed his cabinet.

Notes

Cabinets of Bolivia
Cabinets established in 1970
Cabinets disestablished in 1971
1970 establishments in Bolivia